Jump London is a documentary first broadcast by Channel 4 about parkour and free running in September 2003, directed by Mike Christie and produced by Optomen Television.  It later spawned a sequel, Jump Britain that first aired in January 2005. Both feature documentaries were directed by Mike Christie. 

Jump London followed three French traceurs, Sébastien Foucan, Jérôme Ben Aoues, and Johann Vigroux, as they run around many of London's most famous landmarks, including Royal Albert Hall, Shakespeare's Globe Theatre, HMS Belfast, and many others.

Music
The music used in the film for each location was as follows:

"Ordinary Day" by Bent (from The Everlasting Blink) - Somerset House
"Jump Main Theme" by Ian Masterson - The Mall, Royal Albert Hall
"Jumping" by Ian Masterson - HMS Belfast, Redjacket
"Noctuary" by Bonobo (from Dial 'M' for Monkey) - City of London School, Globe
"London" by Pet Shop Boys / Felix da Housecat (from Disco 3) - Globe, Big Ben shots
"Break My Head" by Thomas Beach - Old County Hall, Saatchi & Saatchi, Soho
"What Your Soul Sings" by Massive Attack (from 100th Window) - National Theatre, Tate Modern

External links
 Jump London page on Channel 4's website 
 

Parkour in film
British sports documentary films